Saskia Tidey (born 11 June 1993 in Dublin) is an Irish sailor, who has represented both Ireland and Great Britain in international sailing regattas.
She represented Ireland at the 2016 Summer Olympics in the 49erFX class.	

In January 2017, Tidey confirmed that she hoped to represent Great Britain at the 2020 Summer Olympics due to the retirement of sailing partner Andrea Brewster and the unavailability of another suitable partner in Ireland for the 49er FX skiff event. She qualified to represent Great Britain through her British born father Don Tidey.

On 1 October, the British Olympic Association confirmed that Tidey had been selected to represent Great Britain at the 2020 Summer Olympics in the 49er FX Skiff class alongside Charlotte Dobson. They finished 6th in their event in Tokyo

References

External links
 

1993 births
Living people
Irish female sailors (sport)
British female sailors (sport)
Olympic sailors of Ireland
Olympic sailors of Great Britain
Sailors at the 2016 Summer Olympics – 49er FX
Sailors at the 2020 Summer Olympics – 49er FX
People educated at Rathdown School